The Bosphorus Express, also known as the Trans Balkan Express, is an international passenger train running between Istanbul, Turkey and Bucharest, Romania. It runs together with the Istanbul-Sofia Express as far as Dimitrovgrad upon entering Bulgaria, where the latter continues to Sofia. The train is jointly operated by three national railways: the TCDD Taşımacılık (TCDD), the Bulgarian State Railways (BDZ), and the Romanian State Railways (CFR). The train serves several important cities including Istanbul, Edirne, Stara Zagora, and Bucharest.

Stock
The train is pulled by a variety of locomotives in each country. Today the train consists of three or four cars usually supplied by the three railways. There are two couchettes, either TCDD Intercity stock or CFR 40-31/44-31 stock, a single coach, either TCDD or CFR, and a CFR sleeping car. Since the train uses electrified and non-electrified track, locomotives pulling the train also change. From Istanbul, the train is pulled by an E68000 electric locomotive to Kapıkule, where a BDŽ class-07 diesel locomotive becomes the motive power. At Dimitrovgrad, Bulgaria, the BDŽ class-07 de-couples and either a BDŽ class-43 or a BDZ class-45 electric locomotive couples onto the train. At Russe, the BDŽ electric locomotive is exchanged with a Romanian class-65 diesel locomotive, which pulls the train to Bucharest.

Typical configurations
İstanbul–Kapıkule
TCDD E68000 Locomotive
TCDD Couchette
TCDD Couchette

Kapıkule–Dimitrovgrad
BDŽ Class-07 Locomotive
TCDD Couchette
TCDD Couchette

Dimitrovgrad–Gorna Oryahovitsa
BDŽ Class-43 or BDŽ Class-45 Locomotive
TCDD Couchette
BDŽ Coach

Gorna Oryahovitsa–Russe
BDŽ Class-43 or BDŽ Class-45 Locomotive
CFR Couchette
TCDD Couchette
BDŽ Coach

Russe–Bucharest
CFR Class-65 Locomotive
CFR Couchette
TCDD Couchette

Between Dimitrovgrad and Russe, one or two BDŽ Coaches are added to the train for domestic travel.

Route
After passing through Edirne it arrives at the town of Kapıkule on the Turkish-Bulgarian border. The electric locomotive disconnects and is replaced with a diesel locomotive Passengers need to disembark and cross the rail tracks to clear passport control. After the city of Gorna Oryahovitsa, the train arrives at the city of Ruse on the Danube river. A diesel locomotive once again takes over, and it crosses the Danube via the Danube Bridge and into the Romanian town of Giurgiu, stopping at the Giurgiu North Railway Station. Then it continues north to Bucharest. After circling the city, the train enters from the northwest into Gara de Nord (Bucharest North) station.

Gallery

Named passenger trains of Turkey
Passenger rail transport in Bulgaria
Passenger rail transport in Romania
International named passenger trains